Josée Beaudin (born December 20, 1961) is a Canadian politician who was elected to represent the electoral district of Saint-Lambert in the 2008 Canadian federal election. A member of the Bloc Québécois, she was defeated for reelection in 2011 by Sadia Groguhé of the New Democratic Party.

References

External links
 

1961 births
Bloc Québécois MPs
Women members of the House of Commons of Canada
Living people
Members of the House of Commons of Canada from Quebec
People from Longueuil
People from Saint-Lambert, Quebec
Women in Quebec politics
21st-century Canadian politicians
21st-century Canadian women politicians